St. Jacques-Coomb's Cove is a town in the Canadian province of Newfoundland and Labrador. The town had a population of 546 in the Canada 2021 Census. It is located on the south coast of the island of Newfoundland on the north side of Fortune Bay, on the southern tip of the Connaigre Peninsula in what is now known as the Coast of Bays Region. The town consists of six communities, St. Jacques, English Harbour West, Mose Ambrose, Boxey, Coomb's Cove, and Wreck Cove, all nestled within the inlets along the coast. They all had their beginnings in the fisheries and the fisheries have always been the mainstay of employment in the communities. In recent years aquaculture was introduced in the area, providing employment for its residents.

The six communities were incorporated into the single town of St. Jacques-Coomb's Cove in 1972.

Demographics 

See also
Connaigre Peninsula
Newfoundland outport

References

Towns in Newfoundland and Labrador